Austin Agwata (born 30 June 2002) is a Nigerian professional footballer who plays for Haninge.

References

External links 
 
 

2002 births
Living people
Footballers from Enugu
Nigerian footballers
Association football forwards
Nigerian expatriate footballers
Expatriate footballers in Belarus
Expatriate footballers in Sweden
FC Minsk players